The New Cathedral is, together with the Old Cathedral, one of the two cathedrals of Salamanca, Spain. It was constructed between the 16th and 18th centuries in two styles: late Gothic and Baroque. Building began in 1513 and the cathedral was consecrated in 1733. It was commissioned by Ferdinand V of Castile. It was declared a national monument by royal decree in 1887.

Architectural style

The building began at a time when the gothic style was becoming less popular and was merging with the new Renaissance style, giving the resulting Plateresque style in Spain. However, this cathedral retained more of its Gothic character because the authorities wanted the new cathedral to blend with the old one. Thus the new cathedral was constructed, continuing with Gothic style during the 17th and 18th centuries. However, during the 18th century, two elements were added that broke with the showy form with the predominant style of the building: a Baroque cupola on the crossing and the final stages of the bell tower (92 m). The new cathedral was constructed without the subsequent destruction of the old cathedral, but a wall of the new cathedral leans on the North wall of the old one. For this reason, the old cathedral had to be reinforced, and the bell tower was constructed on the old one. Two of the main architects of the cathedral were Juan Gil de Hontañón and his son Rodrigo Gil de Hontañón in 1538.

Its main entrance consists of three richly decorated arcs, each leading to the three naves (sections) of the church.

Restoration after the Lisbon earthquake
Cracks and broken windows still visible today are reminders of the devastating effects of the 1755 Lisbon earthquake. After the earthquake, repairs were necessary to the cupola and the base of the tower which were reinforced with a lining of lines of sillares, in the form of a pyramid trunk that spoiled the basic profile of the tower (this tower is a virtual twin of the tower of the cathedral of Segovia). The moment of this catastrophe is commemorated with the "Mariquelo" tradition on  October 31, when every year residents climb to the cupola high above and play flutes and drums.

Restoration in 1992
Among the ornate carvings on the façade are those of a faun eating an ice cream and of an astronaut added during restoration work in 1992, when Jeronimo Garcia, one of the artists responsible for the restoration, chose to add this figure into the structure to symbolise the twentieth century.

References

External links

 Cathedrals of Salamanca website 

Salamanca, New
Roman Catholic churches in Salamanca
16th-century Roman Catholic church buildings in Spain
Roman Catholic churches completed in 1733
Gothic architecture in Castile and León
Renaissance architecture in Castile and León
Baroque architecture in Castile and León
Church buildings with domes